This is a list of the members of the 24th Seanad Éireann, the upper house of the Oireachtas (legislature) of Ireland. These Senators were elected on 27 April 2011 after postal voting closed. The Taoiseach's nominees were announced on 20 May 2011. The Seanad election took place 60 days after the 2011 general election for the Dáil. The 24th Seanad first met at Leinster House on 25 May 2011. Paddy Burke was elected as the new Cathaoirleach of the Seanad.

Composition of the 24th Seanad
There are a total of 60 seats in the Seanad. There are 43 Senators elected by the Vocational panels, 6 elected by the Universities and 11 are nominated by the Taoiseach.

The following table shows the composition by party when the 24th Seanad first met on 25 May 2011.

Effect of changes

Notes

List of senators

Changes

See also
Members of the 31st Dáil
Government of the 31st Dáil

References

External links

How the Seanad is elected – Department of the Environment, Community and Local Government
Seanad Éireann General Election count 2011

 
24